Nema Problema is a 1984 Yugoslav film and the first movie with folk music singer Lepa Brena in the main role. After this movie the film series Hajde da se volimo was begun. The director of the movie is Mića Milošević. It was released on 29 October 1984.

Plot summary
The manager of a company (played by Nikola Simić) gets in trouble when he cannot pay his workers. Billions were spent on a football stadium which is now empty, and the bank did not approve requests for credit for the seemingly meaningless investments. Maybe the stadium will get filled during a concert by a popular singer Lepa Brena (played by herself).

External links
 

Yugoslav comedy films
Films set in Belgrade
1984 films
Cultural depictions of Lepa Brena